Hastina is a genus of moths in the family Geometridae.

Species
Hastina caeruleolineata Moore, 1888
Hastina pluristrigata (Moore, 1868)
Hastina subfalcaria (Christoph, 1881)

References

External links
Natural History Museum Lepidoptera genus database

Asthenini